is a railway station in Motomiya, Fukushima Prefecture, Japan operated by East Japan Railway Company (JR East).

Lines

Station layout
The station has one island platform and one side platform connected to the station building by a footbridge. The station has a Midori no Madoguchi staffed ticket office.

Platforms

History
Motomiya Station opened on December 15, 1887. The station was absorbed into the JR East network upon the privatization of the Japanese National Railways (JNR) on April 1, 1987.

Passenger statistics
In fiscal 2018, the station was used by an average of 1,797 passengers daily (boarding passengers only).

Surrounding area
Motomiya City Hall
Motomiya Post office

Abukuma River

See also
 List of Railway Stations in Japan

References

External links
 
   

Stations of East Japan Railway Company
Railway stations in Fukushima Prefecture
Tōhoku Main Line
Railway stations in Japan opened in 1887
Motomiya, Fukushima